The 1966 European Women Basketball Championship, commonly called EuroBasket Women 1966, was the 10th regional championship held by FIBA Europe. The competition was held in Romania.  won the gold medal and  the silver medal while  won the bronze.

Squads

Group stage

Group A

Group B

Play-off stages

Final ranking

References

External links 
 FIBA Europe profile
 Todor66 profile

1966
1966 in women's basketball
1966 in Romanian women's sport
International women's basketball competitions hosted by Romania
October 1966 sports events in Europe
Women